Chiara District is one of fifteen districts of the province Huamanga in Peru.

Geography 
Other mountains are listed below:

Ethnic groups 
The people in the district are mainly indigenous citizens of Quechua descent. Quechua is the language that the majority of the population (93.68%) learned to speak in childhood, through 6.10% of the residents also spoke the Spanish language (2007 Peru Census).

See also 
 Hatun Usnu

References